Dod or Doddie is a Scottish nickname, usually a diminutive or tee-name for "George".

People with the nickname include:
 Dod Brewster (1891–?), Scottish footballer
 George "Dod" Burrell (1921–2001), Scotland rugby union player, referee and administrator
 Dod Gray (c. 1909–1975), Scottish rugby union and professional rugby league footballer
 Dod Orsborne (1902–1957), Scottish seafarer
 Dod Proctor (1890–1972), English artist
 Doddie Weir (1970-2022), Scottish international rugby union player

See also 
 
 
Doddy (disambiguation), includes a list of people named Doddy

References 

Scottish masculine given names
Lists of people by nickname